Andreas Schulze may refer to:

 Andreas Schulze (political consultant) (born 1964), German political consultant and press secretary
 Andreas Schulze (artist) (born 1955), German painter